Oleksandr Kondratyuk (born 9 April 1983), is a Ukrainian futsal player who plays for Lokomotiv Kharkiv and the Ukraine national futsal team.

References

External links
UEFA profile

1983 births
Living people
Ukrainian men's futsal players
21st-century Ukrainian people